Malva multiflora (syn. Lavatera cretica) is a species of flowering plant in the mallow family known by the common names Cornish mallow and Cretan hollyhock. It is native to western Europe, North Africa, and the Mediterranean Basin, and it is naturalized in areas with a Mediterranean climate, such as parts of Australia, South Africa, and California. This is an annual or biennial herb growing a tough, somewhat hairy stem to a maximum height between 1 and 3 meters. The leaves are multilobed with flat or wavy edges, slightly hairy, and up to 10 centimeters long. The plant bears small pink or light purple flowers with petals just over a centimeter long. The fruit is disc-shaped with 7 to 10 segments.

Leaf laminas of Malva multiflora can track solar position throughout the day and turn to face the sunrise, behavior that anticipates the future, despite lacking a central nervous system.

References

External links
Jepson Manual Treatment
Malvaceae.info Profile
Photo gallery

multiflora
Flora of Southeastern Europe
Flora of Southwestern Europe
Flora of Lebanon
Plants described in 2005
Taxa named by Antonio José Cavanilles